The British Defence Staff – US, which was previously known as British Joint Staff Mission and  British Defence Staff (Washington), is the home of the Ministry of Defence in the United States of America and its purpose is to serve the interests of His Majesty's Government in the USA.

The British Defence Staff – US is led by the Defence Attaché who is British Ambassador's senior adviser on defence issues, and has responsibility over 750 military and civilian Ministry of Defence personnel located both within the Embassy and in 30 states across the USA.

Recent defence attachés
Attachés have included:
1941-1944 Field Marshal Sir John Dill
1945-1947 Field Marshal Lord Wilson
1948-1950 Air Chief Marshal Sir Charles Medhurst
1950-1951 Marshal of the Royal Air Force Lord Tedder
1951-1953 Air Chief Marshal Sir William Elliot
1953-1956 General Sir John Whiteley
1956-1959 Admiral Sir Michael Denny
1959-1962 Air Chief Marshal Sir George Mills
1962-1965 General Sir Michael Alston-Roberts-West
1965-1967 Admiral Sir Nigel Henderson
1967-1970 Lieutenant-General Sir George Lea
1970-1973 Air Marshal Sir John Lapsley
1973-1975 Vice-Admiral Sir Ian Easton
1975-1978 Lieutenant-General Sir Rollo Pain
1978-1981 Air Marshal Sir Roy Austen-Smith
1981-1984 Major-General Anthony Boam
1984-1988 Air Vice-Marshal Ronald Dick
1988-1991 Major-General Edwin Beckett
1991-1994 Air Vice-Marshal Peter Dodworth
1994-1997 Rear-Admiral Anthony Blackburn
1997-2000 Major-General Charles Vyvyan
2000-2002 Air Vice-Marshal John Thompson
2002-2005 Rear-Admiral Anthony Dymock 
2006-2008 Major General Peter Gilchrist
2008-2011 Air Vice Marshal Michael Harwood
2011-2015 Major-General Buster Howes
2015–2017 Major-General Richard Cripwell
2017–2020 Air Vice-Marshal Gavin Parker
2020–2023 Air Vice-Marshal Michael Smeath
2023–Present Rear-Admiral Tim Woods

References

External links
 British Defence Staff - USA

Ministry of Defence (United Kingdom)

United Kingdom–United States relations